Papiya is an Indian given name. Papiya may refer to:

People 
 Papiya Adhikari, Indian actress
 Papiya Ghosh, Indian historian, academic
 Papiya Sengupta, Indian television actress

Other 
 Papiya Nunatak, a rocky hill in Graham Land, Antarctica

Indian feminine given names